The Last Three is a bronze sculpture depicting the last three Northern white rhinoceros by Gillie and Marc. The art-critic Jerry Saltz called the work "a Kitschy Monstrosity," saying it was "an ugly, bathos-filled folly that proves my adage that 95 percent of all public sculpture is crap" and "little more than a place to take selfies." It is installed at the San Antonio Zoo, as of 2018.

References

Animal sculptures in Texas
Bronze sculptures in Texas
Public art in Texas
Mammals in art
Rhinoceroses in popular culture
Works by Australian people